The Asian Boxing Confederation (ASBC) is the Asian governing body in amateur boxing.

ASBC Events
 Asian Amateur Boxing Championships
 Asian Junior Boxing Championships
 Asian Youth Boxing Championships
 Boxing at the Asian Games

External links
 Official website

Amateur boxing organizations
National members of the International Boxing Association (amateur)
Boxing in Asia
Boxing